The Casibari Rock Formation is located on the island of Aruba, towards the center of the island north of the Hooiberg. The formation is a tourist attraction, similar to the Ayo Rock Formations. The rocks in the formation are composed of quartz diorite. Evidence of prehistoric rock drawings is still visible at the formation.

References 

Landforms of Aruba
Tourist attractions in Aruba
Rock formations